Rossella Falk (10 November 1926 – 5 May 2013) was an Italian actress. She had a long career and is possibly best known for appearing in 8½  by  Federico Fellini in 1963.

Life and career
Born in Rome as Rosa Antonia Falzacappa, Falk graduated from the Accademia d'Arte Drammatica in May 1948, a few months after having received the best new actress award at the World Youth Festival in Prague. In a few years she established herself as one of the more talented and requested Italian stage actresses. In 1951 she started a long collaboration with the director Luchino Visconti with the role of Stella in an adaptation of the play A Streetcar Named Desire.

In 1954, after having worked at the Piccolo Teatro in Milan, directed by Giorgio Strehler in La mascherata, Falk started, together with Giorgio De Lullo, Anna Maria Guarnieri, Romolo Valli and Umberto Orsini, the stage company "La compagnia dei giovani" with whom she achieved national and international success. Leaving the company in the 1970s, she continued her stage career working among others with Franco Zeffirelli, Gabriele Lavia, Giuseppe Patroni Griffi.

Less active in cinema, she is probably best known for her role in Federico Fellini's 8½, Falk was also active in television series and radio plays.  Her last work was the 2009 stage play Est Ovest, in which she was directed by Cristina Comencini.

Filmography 

 Guarany (by Riccardo Freda) (1948)
 Angels of Darkness (by Giuseppe Amato) (1954) - Morena
 Vento del sud (by Franco Provenzale) (1960) - Deodata Macri
 8½ (by  Federico Fellini) (1964) - Rosella
 Made in Italy (by Nanni Loy) (1965) - Erminia, His Wife (segment "5 'La Famiglia', episode 2")
 Modesty Blaise (by Joseph Losey) (1966) - Mrs. Fothergill 
 The Legend of Lylah Clare (by Robert Aldrich) (1968) - Rossella
 Run, Psycho, Run (by Brunello Rondi) (1968)
 May Morning (by Ugo Liberatore) (1970) - Mrs. Finley
 The Fifth Cord (by Luigi Bazzoni) (1971) - Sophia Bini
 Black Belly of the Tarantula (by Paolo Cavara) (1971) - Franca Valentino
 Seven Blood-Stained Orchids (by Umberto Lenzi) (1972) - Elena Marchi
 The Killer Is on the Phone (by Alberto De Martino) (1972) - Margaret Vervoort
 Days of Inspector Ambrosio (by Sergio Corbucci) (1988) - Moglie di Vittorio Borghi
 Love Story with Cramps (by Pino Quartullo) (1995) - Directrice agenzia
 Sleepless (by Dario Argento) (2001) - Laura de Fabritiis

References

Further reading 
 Fabio Poggiali, Rossella Falk: la regina del teatro, Bulzoni editore, 2002. .
 Enrico Groppali, Rossella Falk: l'ultima diva, Mondadori, 2006. .
 Elsa Bartolini, Rossella Falk. La «regina», Pontari, 2011. .

External links 

 

1926 births
Italian film actresses
2013 deaths
Italian stage actresses
Italian television actresses
Italian radio personalities
Actresses from Rome
20th-century Italian actresses
21st-century Italian actresses
Accademia Nazionale di Arte Drammatica Silvio D'Amico alumni
Burials at the Cimitero Flaminio